The Nazario Sauro class are diesel-electric submarines operated by the Italian Navy. All boats were built by Fincantieri in Monfalcone.

History
Italy developed the Sauro-class submarines in the 1970s to counter the underwater threat of the Soviet Union. Italian shipbuilding company Fincantieri built these vessels in Monfalcone.

The class entered service in 1980 and replaced the mixed fleet of Toti, Tang and Tench class submarines. A further two units, Leonardo da Vinci and the Guglielmo Marconi were commissioned in 1981 and 1982. In 1983 and 1988 two additional pairs of boats were ordered to the Improved Sauro class design. They were delivered in 1988-89 and 1994-95 by Fincantieri. They were eventually succeeded by the Todaro-class (the joint German-Italian Type 212-based group).

Sauro and Cossato were Batch I boats while da Vinci and Marconi were Batch II boats. Pelosi and Prini made up Batch III and Longobardo and Priaroggia were the two Batch IV boats.

 Batches I and II boats displacement was 1,456 tons surfaced and 1,641 tons submerged. The boats carried SMA SPS-704 radar and Elsag-USEA IPD70/S sonar system.  
 Batch III 1,476 tons surfaced and 1,662 tons submerged. These boats had SMA MM/BPS-704-V2 radar and STN Atlas Elektronik-ISUS 90–20 series sonar. 
 Batch IV 1,653 tons surfaced and 1,862 submerged weight.

Lengths varied between the batches. Beams measured 6.8 meters for all of the class. Draught was increased progressively from 5.3 meters to 6.3 meters. Armament of all the batches was 6 x 533mm torpedo tubes with 12 reloads carried. Batches I and II used Whitehead A-184 torpedo series while batches III and IV used upgraded Whitehead A-184 Mod 3 series.

The Sauro and Marconi were retired in 2001 and 2002 respectively. In 2005, the remaining two original submarines were retired and the remaining four, the Salvatore Pelosi (S522), Giuliano Prini (S523), Primo Longobardo (S524), and Gianfranco Gazzana Priaroggia (S525) were upgraded. These upgrades included replacement of the acoustic sensors and weapons control system, improvements in the communications system, and extension of the service lines.

US approached Italy to purchase retired Sauro-class submarines. Italy tentatively agreed but Taiwan rejected the offer. The plan called for the US to purchase four submarines when decommissioned, then refurbish them in the US and sell them to Taiwan. Once refurbished, the Italian submarines were expected to be operational for another 15 years, and the deal included an extension program.

Design 
There are three sub groups built in four batches:
 S 518 Nazario Sauro named after Nazario Sauro; since September 2009, this unit has been a museum ship in Genoa (part of Galata - Museo del mare).
 S 519 Carlo Fecia di Cossato named after Italian World War II submarine commander Carlo Fecia di Cossato
 S 520 Leonardo da Vinci, named after Leonardo da Vinci
 S 521 Guglielmo Marconi, named after Guglielmo Marconi
 S 522 Salvatore Pelosi, named after Italian World War II submarine commander and war hero Salvatore Pelosi
 S 523 Giuliano Prini, named after Italian World War II submarine commander and war hero Giuliano Prini
 S 524 Primo Longobardo, named after Italian World War II submarine commander and war hero Primo Longobardo
 S 525 Gianfranco Gazzana Priaroggia, named after Italian World War II submarine commander and war hero Gianfranco Gazzana-Priaroggia

List of boats

See also
 List of submarine classes in service

Notes

Bibliography 
 Conway, All the World's Fighting Ships 1947-1995

External links

 Sommergibili Marina Militare website

Submarine classes
 
Ships built by Fincantieri